This is a season-by-season list of records compiled by Dartmouth in men's ice hockey.

Dartmouth College has played in four NCAA tournaments in its history but currently hold the longest drought for teams that have made at least one appearance. Their last tournament berth occurred in 1980.

Season-by-season results

Note: GP = Games played, W = Wins, L = Losses, T = Ties

* Winning percentage is used when conference schedules are unbalanced.

Footnotes

References

 
Lists of college men's ice hockey seasons in the United States
Dartmouth Big Green ice hockey seasons